Laetilia bellivorella is a species of snout moth in the genus Laetilia. It was described by Herbert H. Neunzig in 1997. It is found in the US state of Florida.

References

Moths described in 1997
Phycitini